This electoral calendar 2006 lists the national/federal direct elections held in 2006 in the de jure and de facto sovereign states and their dependent territories. Referendums are included, although they are not elections. By-elections are not included.

See elections in 2006 for an overview of the 2006 results.

January
 15 January: Chile, President (2nd round)
 15 January: Finland, President (1st round)
 22 January: Cape Verde, Parliament
 22 January: Portugal, President
 23 January: Canada, Parliament
 25 January: Palestinian National Authority, Parliament
 29 January: Finland, President (2nd round)

February
 February 5: Costa Rica, President and Parliament
 February 7: Haiti, President (1st round)
 February 11: Tokelau, referendum on self-determination
 February 12: Cape Verde, President
 February 23: Uganda, President and Parliament

March
 5 March: Benin, President
 12 March: El Salvador, Legislature
 12 March: Colombia, Legislature
 19 March: Belarus, President
 26 March: São Tomé and Príncipe, Parliament
 26 March: Ukraine, Parliament
 28 March: Israel, Parliament
 31 March: Samoa, Parliament

April
 2 April: Thailand, Parliament
 5 April: Solomon Islands, Parliament
 9 April: Peru, President and Parliament
 9–10 April: Italy, Parliament
 9 April: Hungary, Parliament (1st round)
 19 April: Thailand, Senate
 21 April: Haiti, Parliament (2nd round)
 23 April: Hungary, Parliament (2nd round)
 30 April: Laos, Parliament

May
 3 May: Chad, President
 6 May: Singapore, Parliament
 6–13 May: Fiji, Parliament
 14 May: Comoros, President
 16 May: Dominican Republic, Legislature
 21 May: Montenegro, Referendum on independence
 21 May: Cyprus, Legislature
 28 May: Colombia, President
 31 May: Montserrat, Legislature

June
 2–3 June: Czech Republic, Chamber of Deputies
 4 June: Peru, President (2nd round)
 4 June: San Marino, Parliament
 14 June: Switzerland, Federal Council (indirect)
 17 June: Slovakia, Parliament
 25 June: Mauritania, referendum on the new constitution
 29 June: Kuwait, Parliament

July
 2 July: Bolivia, Constituent Assembly
 2 July: Mexico, President and Congress
 5 July: Macedonia, Parliament
 28–30 July : Seychelles, President
 30 July: Democratic Republic of the Congo, President and Legislature
 30 July: São Tomé and Príncipe, President

August
 3 August: Tuvalu, Parliament
 28 August: Guyana, President and Parliament

September
 10 September: Montenegro, Parliament
 17 September: Sweden, Parliament
 17 September: Transnistria, referendum on closer ties with Russia
 20 September: Yemen, President
 22 September: The Gambia, President
 26 September: Cook Islands, Parliament
 28 September: Zambia, President and Parliament

October
 1 October: Austria, Legislature
 1 October: Bosnia and Herzegovina, Presidency and Parliament
 1 October: Brazil, President (1st round)
 7 October: Latvia, Parliament
 15 October: Ecuador, President and Parliament
 22 October: Bulgaria, President (1st round)
 22 October: Panama, Panama Canal expansion referendum.
 28–29 October: Serbia, referendum on the new constitution.
 29 October: Brazil, President (2nd round)
 29 October: Democratic Republic of the Congo, President (2nd round)
 29 October: Bulgaria, President (2nd round)

November
 5 November: Nicaragua, President and Parliament
 6 November: Tajikistan, President
 7 November: United States, House of Representatives and Senate (one third: Class 1 senators)
 19 November: Mauritania, Parliament (1st round)
 22 November: The Netherlands, Tweede Kamer
 23 November: Isle of Man, House of Keys
 25 November: Bahrain, Parliament (1st round)
 26 November: Ecuador, President (2nd round)
 30 November: Gibraltar, Referendum on the new constitution

December
 2 December: Bahrain, Parliament (2nd round)
 3 December: Venezuela, President
 3 December: Madagascar, President
 3 December: Mauritania, Parliament (2nd round)
 10 December: Nagorno-Karabakh, constitutional referendum
 10 December: Transnistria, President
 11 December: Saint Lucia, Parliament
 15 December: Iran, Assembly of Experts
 16/18 December: United Arab Emirates, Parliament
 20 December: United Arab Emirates, Parliament
 17 December: Gabon, Parliament

See also
 Elections in 2006

 
Political timelines of the 2000s by year